The Kordofan giraffe (Giraffa antiquorum or Giraffa camelopardalis antiquorum) is a species or subspecies of giraffe found in northern Cameroon, southern Chad, the Central African Republic, and possibly western Sudan. Historically some confusion has existed over the exact range limit of this subspecies compared to the West African giraffe, with populations in e.g. northern Cameroon formerly assigned to the latter. Genetic work has also revealed that all "West African giraffe" in European zoos are in fact Kordofan giraffe. It has been suggested that the Nigerian giraffe's ancestor dispersed from East to North Africa during the Quaternary period and thereafter migrated to its current Sahel distribution in West Africa in response to the development of the Sahara desert. Compared to most other subspecies, the Kordofan giraffe is relatively small at 3.8 to 4.7 meters,  with more irregular spots on the inner legs. Its English name is a reference to Kordofan in Sudan. There are around 2,300 individuals living in the wild.

The Christian Science Monitor lists only 38 individuals being alive in the embattled Garamba National Park in The Democratic Republic of Congo due to poaching; their skin is used for luxury goods and they are said to produce enough meat to feed poachers for weeks. Recent genetic studies also shows distinct genetic populations of giraffes that makes conservation of these subspecies even more important.

References

External links
 
 

Giraffes
Mammals of Chad
Mammals of the Central African Republic
Mammals of the Democratic Republic of the Congo
Mammals of Cameroon